The Smart Studios Story is a 2016 documentary film written, directed and co-produced by Wendy Schneider. The film chronicles the history and impact of Madison, Wisconsin-based recording studio Smart Studios, founded by Butch Vig and Steve Marker in 1983. The film premiered on March 16, 2016, at the SXSW Film Festival and was released on iTunes March 7, 2017.

Appearances 
The documentary features interviews with artists associated with the studio as well as producers, engineers, and label executives, including: 

 Jeff Castelaz
 Jimmy Chamberlin
 Larry Crane
 Billy Corgan
 Duke Erikson
 Laura Jane Grace
 Dave Grohl
 Shirley Manson 
 Steve Marker
 Jonathan Poneman
 Ben Sidran
 Donita Sparks
 Butch Vig
 Chris Walla
 Tom Hazelmyer

Members of the bands Killdozer, Die Kreuzen, Bongzilla, Tar Babies, Young Fresh Fellows, and Appliances SFB also appear in the film.

Production 
After it was reported in January 2010 that Smart Studios would be closing later that year, Schneider announced that production for the documentary was underway. She requested materials such as video, pictures and audio from studio sessions or live shows, along with submissions of cover art, flyers, video testimonials and written stories about the recording facility. Schneider began funding the project via Kickstarter on February 24, 2014, seeking to raise $120,000 by March 30. The crowdfunding campaign was a success, raising $122,230. Schneider shot 70 hours of footage on 16 mm film.

Release 
The Smart Studios Story was selected as the official film of Record Store Day 2016. A promotional cassette featuring more than a dozen bands recorded at the studio will be available at participating record stores across the United States on Record Store Day 2016. The film had its world premiere on March 16, 2016 at the SXSW Film Festival. It opened the Chicago International Movies and Music Festival (CIMMfest) on April 13, 2016, and will screen at the Wisconsin Film Festival on April 17, 2016.

A Tour Edition DVD release was issued at Record Store Day stores on Black Friday 2016. An iTunes release followed on February 14, 2017.

Reception 
Dennis Harvey of Variety considered the "fond, unpretentious feature" a "whirlwind tour of a busy if largely subterranean epoch whose long, often fleetingly glimpsed talent roster should pique the curiosity (and/or nostalgia) of alt-rock archaeologists." Writing for Consequence of Sound, Michael Roffman praised Schneider's "fine job" of bringing the stories to life with archive footage, and, with the amount of media presented, "cleverly match[ing] the vintage footage by lensing the newer interviews in a similar fashion." He, however, deemed the 90 minute length "all-too-lean" as it does not allow the filmmaker to comprehensively "trace the roots of [the Alternative] movement back to not only Smart Studios but the Midwest in general", but considered the film "still an enjoyable and enlightening watch" and "a breezy music lesson". Nick Allen of RogerEbert.com called the film "a really solid documentary that should satisfy music fans and Killdozer enthusiasts alike."

References

External links 
 
 

2016 films
2016 documentary films
American documentary films
Documentary films about the music industry
Rockumentaries
Kickstarter-funded documentaries
2016 directorial debut films
2010s English-language films
2010s American films